The climate of Indonesia is almost entirely tropical.  The uniformly warm waters that make up 81% of Indonesia's area ensure that temperatures on land remain fairly constant, with the coastal plains averaging , the inland and mountain areas averaging , and the higher mountain regions, .  Temperature varies little from season to season, and Indonesia experiences relatively little change in the length of daylight hours from one season to the next; the difference between the longest day and the shortest day of the year is only forty-eight minutes.  This allows crops to be grown all year round.

The main variable of Indonesia's climate is not temperature or air pressure, but rainfall.  The area's relative humidity ranges between 70 and 90%. Winds are moderate and generally predictable, with monsoons usually blowing in from the south and east in June through September and from the northwest in December through March. Typhoons and large-scale storms pose little hazard to mariners in Indonesian waters; the major danger comes from swift currents in channels, such as the Lombok and Sape straits.

Indonesia experiences a number of climates, mostly tropical rainforest (highest precipitation), followed by tropical monsoon and tropical savanna (lowest precipitation). Regions that are above this level (mostly in the Papuan highlands) fall into the tundra climate category and the subpolar oceanic category.

Monsoons
The extreme variations in rainfall are linked with the monsoons. Generally speaking, there is a dry season (April to September), influenced by the Australian continental air masses, and a rainy season (October to March) that is caused by Asia and Pacific Ocean air masses. Local wind patterns, however, can greatly modify these general wind patterns, especially in the islands of central Maluku—Seram, Ambon, and Buru. This oscillating annual pattern of wind and rain is related to Indonesia's geographical location as an isthmus between two large continents. In September and May, high pressure over the Gobi desert moves winds from that continent toward the northwest. As the winds reach the equator, the Earth's rotation causes them to veer off their original course in a northeasterly direction toward the Southeast Asian mainland. During January and February, a corresponding low pressure system over Asia causes the pattern to reverse. The result is a monsoon which is augmented by humid breezes from the Indian Ocean, producing significant amounts of rain throughout many parts of the Malay Archipelago. See also monsoon trough.

Prevailing winds
Prevailing wind patterns interact with local topographic conditions to produce significant variations in rainfall throughout the archipelago. In general, western and northern parts of Indonesia experience the most precipitation, since the north- and westward-moving monsoon clouds are heavy with moisture by the time they reach these more distant regions. In part, this moisture originates on high mountain peaks that trap damp air. The city of Bogor, near Jakarta, lays claim to having the world's highest number of thunderstorm days per year—322. To complicate the situation, some of the islands of the southern Malukus experience highly unpredictable rainfall patterns, depending on local wind currents.

Temperature

Although air temperature changes little from season to season or from one region to the next, cooler temperatures prevail at higher elevations. In general, temperatures drop approximately 1 °C per 90-meter increase in elevation from sea level with some high-altitude interior mountain regions experiencing night frosts. The highest mountain ranges in Papua are permanently capped with snow.

See also
Climate change in Indonesia
Environment of Indonesia
Geography of Indonesia

Notes

References

 
Indonesia
Environment of Indonesia